was the 82nd emperor of Japan, according to the traditional order of succession. His reign spanned the years from 1183 through 1198.

This 12th-century sovereign was named after Emperor Toba, and go- (後), translates literally as "later"; and thus, he is sometimes called the "Later Emperor Toba". The Japanese word go has also been translated to mean the "second one"; and in some older sources, this emperor may be identified as "Toba the Second" or as "Toba II".

Genealogy
He was also known as Takanari-shinnō

He was the fourth son of Emperor Takakura, and thus grandson of Emperor Go-Shirakawa. His mother was Bōmon Shokushi (坊門殖子) (Empress Dowager Shichijō-in, 七条院), daughter of Bōmon Nobutaka (坊門信隆) of the Fujiwara clan.

Consorts and children
Empress (chūgū): Fujiwara no Ninshi/Takako (藤原任子) later Gishūmon-in (宜秋門院), Kujō Kanezane‘s daughter
 First Daughter: Imperial Princess Shōshi (昇子内親王) later Shunkamon-in (春華門院, 1195–1211) – unmarried Empress as adopted mother of Emperor Juntoku
Consort: Minamoto no Zaishi/Ariko (源在子) later Shomeimon-in (承明門院; 1171–1257), Minamoto no Michichika‘s adopted daughter and priest Nōen‘s daughter
 First Son:  Imperial Prince Tamehito (為仁親王) later Emperor Tsuchimikado
Consort: Fujiwara no Shigeko (藤原重子) later Shumeimon-in (修明門院; 1182–1264), Takakura Norisue‘s daughter
 Third Son: Imperial Prince Morinari (守成親王) later Emperor Juntoku
 Imperial Prince Masanari (雅成親王) (exiled after Jōkyū War)
 Imperial Prince Priest Sonkai (尊快法親王, 1204–1246) – Head Priest of Enryaku-ji Temple (Tendai Zasu, 天台座主)
Court lady: Bōmon no Tsubone (坊門局), Bōmon Nobukiyo‘s daughter
 Imperial Prince Nagahito (長仁親王, 1196–1249) later Imperial Prince Priest Dōjo (道助法親王), become 8th Head priest of Ninna-ji Temple 
 Third Daughter: Imperial Princess Reishi (礼子内親王; 1200–1273) later Kayōmon-in (嘉陽門院)
 Imperial Prince Yorihito (頼仁親王, 1201–1264) (exiled after Jōkyū Incident)
Court lady: Hyōe-no-kami no Tsubone (兵衛督局), Minamoto no Nobuyasu‘s daughter
 Second Daughter: Imperial Princess Shukushi (粛子内親王; b.1196) (Takatsuji Saigū, 高辻斎宮) – Saiō at Ise Shrine 1199–1210
Court lady: Owari no Tsubone (尾張局, d.1204), priest Kensei‘s daughter
 Imperial Prince Dōkaku (道覚法親王; 1204–1250) – Head Priest of Enryaku-ji Temple (Tendai Zasu, 天台座主)
Court lady: Ōmiya no Tsubone (大宮局), Fujiwara no Sadayoshi‘s daughter
 Imperial Prince Son'en (尊円法親王; 1207–1231) – Head Priest of Miidera Temple
 Gyōetsu (行超) – priest in Emryakuji Temple
Court lady: Shonagon no Suke (少納言典侍)
 Dōshu (道守) – priest
Court lady: Kamegiku (亀菊), a dancer (Shirabyōshi)
Court lady: Taki (滝; d.1265), a dancer (Shirabyōshi)
 Imperial Prince Kakunin (覚仁法親王) (1198–1266) – Head priest of Onjō-ji Temple
Court lady: Tamba no Tsubone (丹波局), Ishi (石), a dancer (Shirabyōshi)
 Imperial Princess Hiroko (煕子内親王, b.1205) – Saiō served at Ise Shrine during the reigns of Emperor Juntoku and Emperor Chūkyō 1215–1221
Court lady: Himehōshi (姫法師), a dancer (Shirabyōshi)
 Kakuyo (覚誉) – priest
 Dōi (道伊) – priest in Onjō-ji Temple
 Dōen (道縁) – priest in Ninna-ji Temple
Mother Unknown:
 Son: Prince Ichijo (一条宮、1201-1213）
 princess（1202-1207）

Events of Go-Toba's life
Go-Toba took the throne at the age of three.
 September 8, 1183 (Juei 2, 20th day of the 8th month): In the 3rd year of Antoku-tennōs reign (安徳天皇三年), the emperor fled the capital rather than give in to pressures for his abdication. In Antoku's absence, the cloistered former-Emperor Go-Shirakawa then elevated his young brother by decree; and the young child was given the acceptance of abdication (juzen) rites. The anti-Taira faction intended that the succession ('‘senso'’) was received; and shortly thereafter, Emperor Go-Toba is said to have acceded to the throne ('‘sokui'’).

Although these formal rites and ceremonies were taking place in Heian-kyō, the imperial regalia were still held by Antoku. Thus, the senso and sokui of Go-Toba became the first in history to omit the ritual transmission of the sacred treasures from a sovereign to his successor.

In 1192 Go-Shirakawa died and the first shogunate was established by Minamoto no Yoritomo, and the emperor became a figurehead.

In 1198, Go-Toba abdicated in favor of his son, Emperor Tsuchimikado.

Go-Toba reigned as cloistered Emperor from 1198 till 1221 during reigns of three emperors, but his power was more limited than former cloistered Emperors in the Heian period.

It was during this time that Go-Toba decreed that the followers of the Pure Land sect in Kyōto, led by Hōnen, be banished or in some cases executed. Originally this was prompted by complaints of clergy in Kyoto who were concerned about the rise in popularity of the new sect, but Go-Toba personally ordered the decree after two of his ladies in waiting converted to the sect without his knowledge.

In 1221, the shōgun installed Go-Toba's three-year-old grandson, Emperor Chūkyō, as emperor, but Go-Toba chose to stage a rebellion in an attempt to reclaim the throne and overthrow the Kamakura shogunate. This is known as the Jōkyū War after the era in which it occurred. Samurai around Kyōto who were against the Shogunate supported him but most of samurai, particularly in Kantō supported the Shogunate with encouragement of Hōjō Masako, the widow of Yoritomo. She persuaded samurai gathering in Kamakura that if they would not support the Shōgunate, then the contemporary status and privileges that samurai had attained would be lost, and the court and kuge would regain their power and influence. Go-Toba's rebellion was defeated and Chūkyō was replaced as emperor by Go-Horikawa, a nephew of Go-Toba.

After the rebellion Go-Toba was exiled to the Oki Islands. He died and was buried there.

Non-political activities

Despite the limits on his political powers, he developed skills as a calligrapher, painter, musician, poet, critic, and editor, although the majority of his activities took place after his abdication aged 18 (as the abdication freed him from 'the ceremonial prison of the imperial palace').

Besides his enthusiasm for archery, equestrianism, and swordsmanship, Go-Toba was a great lover of swords themselves, and over the course of several years summoned the most talented swordsmiths in the land to his court where they were given honorary titles and invited to teach the emperor their craft. He became a respectable swordsmith himself, and it was his patronage and encouragement of this art that gave birth to Japan's 'Golden Age' of bladesmithing. His contribution to the art is still held in such high esteem, that even today a tradition is maintained in sword literature that he is the first swordsmith to be discussed.

His greatest contribution to literature is the Shin Kokinshū (The New Anthology of Ancient and Modern Waka), which Japanese has considered one of three major influential waka anthologies along Man'yōshū and Kokin Wakashū. He ordered its creation and took part in the working group as an editor. He revived the Office of Waka (和歌所) and made it the headquarters of this edition. He held many utakai (waka parties) and utaawase (waka competitions). Not only the creator and organizer, he acted as a critic, and wrote the style of waka in general and criticism of his contemporary poets.

During his exile, he continued to compose hundreds of waka and to edit both anthologies from his creation in Oki Islands and a private edition of Shin Kokinshū for 18 years, getting rid of around 400 wakas from the former edition, while its edition had been officially declared to be completed in 1204, and further elaborations finished even in 1216. While he declared his private edition should be authentic, today the 1216 version is considered as the authentic and others as variants. His edition is today called Oki-bon Shin Kokinshū (Oki edition). It is probable that during his exile, he also wrote his Go-Toba no in gokuden ("Secret Teachings"), a short work on aesthetic criticism; the "Secret Teachings" are particularly valuable as a major source on Go-Toba's complicated relationships with his former client, the greatest poet of the age – Fujiwara no Teika.

One of his 31-syllable poems was chosen by Fujiwara no Teika as Number 99 in the popular anthology Hyakunin Isshu.

Kugyō
Kugyō (公卿) is a collective term for the very few most powerful men attached to the court of the Emperor of Japan in pre-Meiji eras.

In general, this elite group included only three to four men at a time. These were hereditary courtiers whose experience and background would have brought them to the pinnacle of a life's career. During Go-Toba's reign, this apex of the Daijō-kan included:
 Sesshō, Konoe Motomichi, 1160–1233.
 Sesshō, Matsu Morie, 1172–1238.
 Sesshō, Kujō Kanezane.
 Daijō-daijin, Kujō Kanezane.
 Daijō-daijin, Kujō Kanefusa, d. 1217.
 Sadaijin, Ōimikado Tsunemune, 1119–1189.
 Sadaijin, Todaiji Sanesada, 1139–1191.
 Sadaijin, Sanjō Sanefusa, 1147–1225.
 Sadaijin, Ōimikado Yorizane, 1155–1225.
 Udaijin, Tokudaiji Sanesada.
 Udaijin, Sanjō Sanefusa.
 Udaijin, Ōimikado Yorizane.
 Nadaijin, Matsu Morie.
 Nadaijin, Tokudaiji Sanesada.
 Nadaijin, Konoe Motomichi.
 Nadaijin, Kujō Kanefusa.
 Nadaijin, Kujō Yoshimichi, 1167–1188.
 Nadaijin, Fujiwara Tudachida, d. 1195.
 Nadaijin, Kujō Yoshitsine, 1169–1206.
 Dainagon

Eras of Go-Toba's reign
The years of Go-Toba's reign are more specifically identified by more than one era name or nengō.
 Juei           (1182–1184)
 Genryaku       (1184–1185)
 Bunji          (1185–1190)
 Kenkyū  (1190–1199)

Ancestry

See also
 Emperor of Japan
 List of Emperors of Japan
 Imperial cult
 Minase Shrine

Notes

References
 Brown, Delmer M. and Ichirō Ishida, eds. (1979). Gukanshō: The Future and the Past. Berkeley: University of California Press. ; OCLC 251325323
 Brownlee, John S. (1991). Political Thought in Japanese Historical Writing: From Kojiki (712) to Tokushi Yoron (1712). Waterloo, Ontario: Wilfrid Laurier University Press. 
 Brower, Robert H. "Ex-Emperor Go-Toba's Secret Teachings": Go-Toba no in Gokuden. Harvard Journal of Asiatic Studies, Vol. 32, (1972), pp 5–70.
 Ponsonby-Fane, Richard Arthur Brabazon. (1959). The Imperial House of Japan. Kyoto: Ponsonby Memorial Society. OCLC 194887
 Titsingh, Isaac. (1834). Nihon Odai Ichiran; ou, Annales des empereurs du Japon. Paris: Royal Asiatic Society, Oriental Translation Fund of Great Britain and Ireland. OCLC 5850691
 Varley, H. Paul. (1980). Jinnō Shōtōki: A Chronicle of Gods and Sovereigns. New York: Columbia University Press. ; OCLC 59145842
 Smits, Ivo (1998) "The Poet and the Politician: Teika and the Compilation of the Shinchokusenshu" Monumenta Nipponica 53(4): pp. 427–472, p. 446

 
Japanese emperors
Japanese rebels
1180 births
1239 deaths
13th-century Japanese poets
Emperor Go-Toba
People of Kamakura-period Japan
1180s in Japan
1190s in Japan
12th-century Japanese monarchs
13th-century Japanese people
Hyakunin Isshu poets
Deified Japanese people
Kamakura period Buddhist clergy
Japanese Buddhist monarchs
Japanese retired emperors
People from Kyoto